Wilhelm Reinhold Johannes Kunze (March 5, 1904 – November 4, 1943) was a German World War II prisoner of war (POW) held at Camp Tonkawa, Oklahoma. He was a Gefreiter in the Afrika Korps. Following a trial before a kangaroo court on November 4, 1943, he was beaten to death by fellow POWs based on allegations of treason and spying for the Americans. The unmasking of Kunze happened by accident; he had been in the habit of passing notes to the American doctor at the camp during sick call. These notes contained useful information regarding the activities of various POWs in the camp, some of whom were loyal Nazis. One day a new American doctor was on duty who did not know about Kunze's role as spy and who could not speak German. When Kunze handed over his note, the American doctor accidentally blew Kunze's cover by sending it back via another POW, who read the incriminating note and quickly realised that Kunze was a spy. News of this discovery spread quickly and soon afterwards Kunze was killed inside the camp by his fellow POWs. He is buried in the Fort Reno prisoner of war cemetery.

Five German POWs were charged with Kunze's murder. The case was prosecuted by Leon Jaworski, later the special prosecutor in the Watergate case. The trial took place at Camp Gruber near Muskogee. All five defendants were found guilty of premeditated murder, sentenced to death, and subsequently executed by hanging at the United States Disciplinary Barracks, Fort Leavenworth, Kansas on July 10, 1945. Although the death sentences were confirmed by President Roosevelt in October 1944, the executions were delayed until after the end of the war in Europe due to the fear of reprisals against Allied prisoners held by Germany. Afterwards, the bodies of the executed men were buried in Fort Leavenworth Military Prison Cemetery.

The death of Johannes Kunze is the subject of these nonfiction accounts: Vincent S. Green's Extreme Justice, and Wilma Parnell's Killing of Corporal Kunze.

See also 

 List of people executed by the United States military

Notes and references

1904 births
1943 deaths
Deaths by beating in the United States
German Army personnel killed in World War II
German prisoners of war in World War II held by the United States
Prisoners murdered in custody
Prisoners who died in United States military detention
German people who died in prison custody
German people murdered abroad
Lynching deaths in Oklahoma
German Army soldiers of World War II